Christ Episcopal Church and Parish House is a historic Episcopal church located at 320 Pollock Street in New Bern, Craven County, North Carolina.  It was built in 1871, incorporating the brick shell of the previous church built in 1824.  It is a brick church building in a restrained Gothic Revival style.  It features a three-stage entrance tower, with a pyramidal roof and octagonal spire.  Beneath the tower is a Stick Style entrance porch added in 1884.  The parish house was built between 1904 and 1908, and is a two-story, three bay by five bay, rectangular red brick building with a steep slate gable roof.

A five-piece communion service, the gift of George II, is on secure display in the church when not in use. There is a chalice, paten/cover, two flagons, and a basin for receiving the offering. All pieces bear the royal arms and are completely hallmarked for London, 1752, maker Mordecai Fox.

It was listed on the National Register of Historic Places in 1973.

External links 
 Official website of Christ Episcopal Church in New Bern

References

Episcopal church buildings in North Carolina
Churches in New Bern, North Carolina
Churches on the National Register of Historic Places in North Carolina
Gothic Revival church buildings in North Carolina
Churches completed in 1824
19th-century Episcopal church buildings
National Register of Historic Places in Craven County, North Carolina